Stanley Barron Freeborn (December 11, 1891 – July 17, 1960) served as the first chancellor of University of California, Davis between 1958 and June 1959. Prior to being the first chancellor of UC Davis, Freeborn was the dean of the College of Agriculture at UC Berkeley. Following his death in 1960, UC Davis renamed its assembly hall to Freeborn Hall in his honor.

References

External links 
 
Stanley B. Freeborn Papers at Special Collections Dept., University Library, University of California, Davis
 Images of Stanley Freeborn from UCD Archives

Chancellors of the University of California, Davis
1960 deaths
1891 births
20th-century American academics